Dragon & Lion dance at the 2009 Asian Indoor Games was held at Nguyễn Du Gymnasium, Ho Chi Minh City, Vietnam from 2 November to 4 November 2009.

Medalists

Dragon dance

Northern lion

Southern lion

Medal table

Results

Dragon dance

Compulsory exercise
4 November

Optional exercise
2 November

Northern lion

Compulsory exercise
2 November

Optional exercise
3 November

Southern lion

Compulsory exercise
3 November

Optional exercise
4 November

References 
 Official site

2009 Asian Indoor Games events